Zélio Fernandino de Moraes (10 April 1892– 3 October 1975) was a Brazilian medium who is considered the founder of the Umbanda religion.

Biography
He was born on 10 April 1892 in São Gonçalo. At the age of 17, Zélio joined the Brazilian Navy. He was hospitalized with paralysis, but claimed to have been miraculously healed after he predicted that he would have been healed the next day. This led to contacts with Brazilian spiritism movements, and he became spokesman for a spirit entity named "Caboclo das Sete Encruzilhadas." As part of a Kardecist spiritual group, he later claimed to be in contact with other entities, including one named "Father Antônio", which he clearly described as a spirit of an old man.

Between 1918 and 1935, Zélio organized various temples/centers for Umbanda. In 1939, the Spiritist Union of Umbanda in Brazil (União Espiritista de Umbanda do Brasil, or UEUB) was formed to oversee the centers. Zélio continued to actively run the organization until his death at age 84.

References
Saidenberg, Theresa. "Como surgiu a Umbanda em nosso país: 70° aniversário de uma religião brasileira." Revista Planeta, São Paulo, N. 75, December 1978. p. 34–38. 
"O fundador da Umbanda e sua missão na Terra." Seleções de Umbanda, N. 6–7, 1975.

1891 births
1975 deaths
Brazilian spiritual mediums
Founders of new religious movements
People from São Gonçalo, Rio de Janeiro
Zélio